Bernd Karbacher was the defending champion but lost in the quarterfinals to Tomas Carbonell.

Fernando Meligeni won in the final 6–4, 6–4 against Christian Ruud.

Seeds
A champion seed is indicated in bold text while text in italics indicates the round in which that seed was eliminated.

  Jonas Björkman (first round)
  Gilbert Schaller (first round)
  Bernd Karbacher (second round)
  Bohdan Ulihrach (second round)
  Carlos Costa (semifinal)
  Christian Ruud (final)
  Marc-Kevin Goellner (quarterfinals)
  Anders Jarryd (first round)

Draw

External links
 1995 Swedish Open draw

Men's Singles
Singles